Good Hope is a town in Walton County, Georgia, United States. The population was 210 at the 2000 census.

History
The Georgia General Assembly incorporated the place as the Town of Good Hope in 1905. The community was so named on account of the first settlers' "good hope" their town would grow to become prosperous.

Geography

Good Hope is located at  (33.786925, -83.609638).

Demographics

As of the census of 2000, there were 210 people, 85 households, and 66 families residing in the town. The racial makeup of the town was 95.71% White, 0.95% African American, 1.43% Native American, 0.48% from other races, and 1.43% from two or more races. Hispanic or Latino people of any race were 0.95% of the population.

There were 85 households, out of which 27.1% had children under the age of 18 living with them, 70.6% were married couples living together, 7.1% had a female householder with no husband present, and 21.2% were non-families. 17.6% of all households were made up of individuals, and 10.6% had someone living alone who was 65 years of age or older.  The average household size was 2.47 and the average family size was 2.78.

In the town, the population was spread out, with 17.6% under the age of 18, 7.1% from 18 to 24, 31.4% from 25 to 44, 28.1% from 45 to 64, and 15.7% who were 65 years of age or older.  The median age was 41 years. For every 100 females, there were 100.0 males.  For every 100 females age 18 and over, there were 106.0 males.

The median income for a household in the town was $43,250, and the median income for a family was $56,250. Males had a median income of $36,250 versus $25,313 for females. The per capita income for the town was $20,957.  About 9.7% of families and 12.9% of the population were below the poverty line, including 33.3% of those under the age of eighteen and none of those 65 or over.

Notable person
Moina Michael, a.k.a., the Poppy Lady, was born in the town of Good Hope, in 1869. She pioneered the symbol of the silk poppy in tribute to World War I veterans.

References

Towns in Georgia (U.S. state)
Towns in Walton County, Georgia